Rudy Creek is a stream in the U.S. state of South Dakota.

A variant name was Rudey Creek. The stream has the name of an early cattleman.

See also
List of rivers of South Dakota

References

Rivers of Haakon County, South Dakota
Rivers of Ziebach County, South Dakota
Rivers of South Dakota